Hollywood Burbank Airport, legally and formerly marketed as Bob Hope Airport after entertainer Bob Hope , is a public airport  northwest of downtown Burbank, in Los Angeles County, California, United States. The airport serves Burbank, Hollywood and the northern Greater Los Angeles area, which include Glendale, Pasadena, and the San Fernando Valley. It is closer to many popular attractions including Griffith Park, Universal Studios Hollywood, and Downtown Los Angeles than Los Angeles International Airport (LAX), and is the only airport in the area with a direct rail connection to Downtown Los Angeles, with service from two stations: Burbank Airport–North and Burbank Airport–South. Nonstop flights mostly serve cities in the western United States, while JetBlue has daily flights to New York City.

Originally the entire airport was within the Burbank city limits, but the north end of Runway 15/33 has been extended into the city of Los Angeles. The airport is owned by the Burbank–Glendale–Pasadena Airport Authority and controlled by the governments of those cities. The Airport Authority contracts with TBI Airport Management, Inc., to operate the airport, which has its own police and fire departments, the Burbank–Glendale–Pasadena Airport Authority Police. Boarding uses portable boarding steps or ramps rather than jet bridges. The Federal Aviation Administration (FAA) National Plan of Integrated Airport Systems for 2017–2021 categorized it as a medium-hub primary commercial service facility.

For the purposes of noise abatement, commercial flights are scheduled between the hours of 7:00 am and 10:00 pm.

History
The airport has been named United Airport (1930–1934), Union Air Terminal (1934–1940), Lockheed Air Terminal (1940–1967), Hollywood–Burbank Airport (1967–1978), Burbank–Glendale–Pasadena Airport (1978–2003), and Bob Hope Airport after comedian Bob Hope (since 2003 as the legal name). In 2017 it was rebranded as Hollywood Burbank Airport due to the lack of recognition of Bob Hope Airport's geographic region.

United Aircraft and Transport Corporation (UA&T) was a holding company created in 1928 that included Boeing Aircraft and United Air Lines, itself a holding company for a collection of small airlines that continued to operate under their own names. One of these airlines was Pacific Air Transport (PAT), which Boeing had acquired because of PAT's west coast mail contract in January 1928. UA&T sought a site for a new airport for PAT and found one in Burbank. UA&T had the benefit of surveys that the Aeronautics Department of the Los Angeles Chamber of Commerce had conducted starting in 1926 to identify potential airport sites.

It took UA&T a year and the cooperation of the city to assemble the site. The  site was rife with vines and trees and the ground had to be filled and leveled, but it had good drainage, a firm landing surface, steady winds, and good access to ground transport. Construction was completed in just seven months. In an age when few aircraft had brakes and many had a tail skid instead of a wheel, runways were not usually paved; those at Burbank had a  mixture of oil and sand. There were no taxi strips, but the designers left room for them. These were generous dimensions, and the site had room for expansion.

United Airport was dedicated amid much festivity (including an air show) on Memorial Day weekend (May 30 – June 1), 1930. The airport and its handsome Spanish Revival-style terminal was a showy competitor to nearby Grand Central Airport in Glendale, which was then Los Angeles' main airline terminal. The new Burbank facility was actually the largest commercial airport in the Los Angeles area until it was eclipsed in 1946 by the Los Angeles Airport in Westchester when that facility (formerly Mines Field, then Los Angeles Municipal Airport) commenced scheduled airline operations.

The Burbank facility remained United Airport until 1934 when it was renamed Union Air Terminal. The name change came the same year that Federal anti-trust actions caused United Aircraft and Transport to dissolve, which took effect September 26, 1934. The Union Air Terminal moniker stuck until Lockheed bought the airport in 1940 and renamed it Lockheed Air Terminal.

In March 1939 airlines scheduled sixteen departures a day out of Burbank: eight United Airlines, five Western Airlines and three TWA (American Airlines' three departures were still at Glendale). Airline flights continued even while Lockheed's extensive factories supplied the war effort and developed military and civil aircraft into the mid-1960s. The April 1957 OAG lists nine weekday departures on Western, six on United, six on Pacific Air Lines, one on TWA and one on American Airlines (a nonstop to Chicago Midway Airport). Pacific Southwest Airlines (PSA) had 48 Douglas DC-4 departures a week to SFO and SAN (PSA did not fly out of LAX until 1958). In 1958 Transocean Air Lines Lockheed Constellations flew to Honolulu three times a week; twice a week a Constellation flew Oakland - Burbank - Chicago Midway Airport - New York Idlewild Airport (now JFK Airport) - Hartford. In summer 1962 PSA flights to San Francisco and San Diego were all Lockheed L-188 Electras, a  total of 32 departures a week from Burbank.

Jets arrived at Burbank in the late 1960s: Pacific Air Lines flew Boeing 727-100s nonstop to Las Vegas and San Francisco and one-stop to Eureka/Arcata. Pacific Southwest Airlines (PSA) flew 727s to the San Francisco Bay Area and San Diego, and Hughes Airwest (previously Air West) flew Douglas DC-9-10s and McDonnell Douglas DC-9-30s nonstop to Las Vegas, Phoenix, Salt Lake City and Denver with one-stop DC-9s to Houston Hobby Airport. Hughes Airwest even operated one-stop DC-9s to Grand Canyon National Park Airport near the south rim of the Grand Canyon. In 1986 United Airlines Boeing 767-200s flew nonstop to Chicago O'Hare Airport; the 767 was the largest passenger airliner ever to serve Burbank. AirCal McDonnell Douglas MD-80s flew nonstop to the Bay Area and direct to Lake Tahoe.

In 1967 Lockheed renamed the facility Hollywood–Burbank Airport. In 1970 Continental Airlines began Boeing 727-200 flights to Portland and Seattle via San Jose and also flew the short hop to Ontario. Continental later offered flights to Chicago via Ontario. Continental went on to serve Denver with nonstop Boeing 727-200s from BUR. Alaska Airlines began serving Burbank in 1981 with Boeing 727-100s and 727-200s flying nonstop and direct to Seattle and Portland, which was Alaska Air's first service to southern California. Aloha Airlines pioneered nonstop jet service from BUR to Hawaii, flying Boeing 737-700s to Honolulu before ending all passenger operations.

A 1973 decision by the United States Supreme Court in City of Burbank v. Lockheed Air Terminal, Inc. overturned an airport curfew imposed by the city of Burbank on flights between 11:00 pm and 7:00 am under the U.S. Constitution's Supremacy Clause on the grounds that airports were subject to federal oversight by the Federal Aviation Administration and under the terms of the Noise Control Act of 1972. The airport now has a strict voluntary noise abatement procedure to reduce noise of aircraft arriving and departing from the airport. Commercial flights are scheduled between the hours of 7:00 am and 10:00 pm, all departing flights take off to the south on runway 15, and all arriving flights land on runway 8.

The facility remained Hollywood–Burbank Airport for more than a decade until 1978 when Lockheed sold it to the Burbank–Glendale–Pasadena Airport Authority. The airport then got its fifth name: Burbank–Glendale–Pasadena Airport (1978–2003). On November 6, 2003, the airport authority voted to change the name to Bob Hope Airport in honor of comedian Bob Hope, a longtime resident of nearby Toluca Lake, who had died earlier that year and who had kept his personal airplane at the airfield. The new name was unveiled on December 17, 2003, on the 100th anniversary of the Wright brothers' first flight in 1903, the year that Bob Hope was born.

After much debate between the Airport Authority, the city of Burbank, the Transportation Security Administration, and Burbank residents, in November 2007 it was decided that a new $8 million to $10 million baggage screening facility for Terminal B is legal, considering the anti-growth limitations placed on the airport. The facility will house a $2.5-million explosive detection system, used for the automatic detection of explosives within checked luggage. However, the facility is still in the early planning phases.

On June 27, 2014, a $112 million Regional Transportation Center opened. The 520,000-square-foot (48,310-square-meter) center at Hollywood Way and Empire Avenue was also built to withstand a major earthquake while serving as an emergency "nerve center." The industrial-looking hub with a red steel roof will be adorned by 16, three-story art panels. Solar panels generating 1.5 megawatts of electricity will also be added to its roof. A nearby parking garage was built to handle more than 1,000 cars, while traffic lights have been reworked around the airport.

Flight path changes and related noise issues 
Flight paths of aircraft departing Hollywood Burbank Airport changed as part of the Federal Aviation Administration's airspace modernization program called NextGen. An independent analysis conducted by Landrum & Brown, Incorporated confirmed in the Final Report dated October 2018 that "a connection was found between the Metroplex (RNAV) implementation and the increase in the number of flights over areas south of the 101 Freeway.".  Patrick Lammerding, the airport's deputy executive director of planning and development, told The New York Times that in 2016, the airport received 577 complaints; a year after the flight path changes, in 2018, the number rose to 222,798; in the first half of 2019, complaints soared to 616,022. Both the airport itself and third-party sources track noise complaints for the Hollywood Burbank Airport.  In addition to the airport's systems (Webtrak), as of December 14, 2022, third party site Airnoise.io has received 3,540,332 noise complaints for the Hollywood Burbank Airport. While the airport's Webtrak website requires users to fill out a web page with all the details of each aircraft disturbance, when pressed while an aircraft is overhead, the Airnoise button and website will automatically file a complaint on the user's behalf. While in-person meetings regarding noise issues have been held in large meeting spaces with hundreds of attendees, airport staff claims that approximately 90% of complaints are filed by 45 individuals. Such a claim is consistent with the airport's continued inaction to address these issues, despite repeated pleas for relief and solutions from local communities and elected officials from every level of government. In 2019 and 2020, the airport and various stakeholders participated in a Southern San Fernando Valley Airport Noise Task Force administered by aviation industry consultants that held meetings and presented 16 recommendations to the FAA on June 8, 2020, to address the issue. The FAA responded by letter on September 1, 2020, that most of the recommendations were either "not operationally feasible" or "not technically feasible" and, as of July 29, 2022, has not implemented any solutions. On August 1, 2022, Hollywood Burbank Airport received $3 million for Infrastructure upgrades and $805,900 dollars will go toward an Airport Noise Compatibility Planning study, including updating Noise Exposure Maps and identifying where the airport can undertake mitigation efforts, according to Schiff's office. As part of the noise study, the airport is also establishing a 12-member Citizen's Advisory Committee, which will include a majority of representatives from non-impacted areas: 3 members respectively from the airport owner cities of Burbank, Glendale, and Pasadena (9 total), and 1 member, respectively, from each of Los Angeles Council Districts 2, 4, and 6 (3 total).

Future

There is also a replacement terminal in the works at the airport. A plan to develop a new airport terminal building was unveiled by the Burbank–Glendale–Pasadena Airport Authority in 2013. The replacement terminal would cost a reported $400 million and meet newer seismic standards and be farther from the runway as required by the Federal Aviation Administration. The new location is west of Hollywood Way on undeveloped property that has been used in recent years for parking. The Burbank City Council allowed voters decide on the plan. Known as Measure B, the proposal went before Burbank city voters on November 8, 2016, and passed with 69% of voters approving.

The next step in the terminal replacement process is for the Airport Authority to finalize the new terminal's design, get FAA approval (NEPA clearance for which was obtained on Tuesday, May 18, 2021) and then secure the required financing from the FAA and other sources. Airport funding sources include FAA grants, parking fees, landing fees charged to airlines, as well as rents from restaurants and other concession businesses operating at the airport. There are also fees charged on airline tickets sold, including passenger facility charges and federal taxes. Once the funding is secured, the Airport Authority will accept bids for the project. The replacement terminal is expected to encompass 355,000 square feet (32,981 square meters) and the same number of gates (14). Travelers will have more restrooms, additional restaurant and concession space, improved security screening areas, and other enhanced passenger amenities in the new facility.

In July 2021, the City of Los Angeles filed a lawsuit against the FAA alleging deficiencies in the environmental review process for the proposed replacement passenger terminal at the Hollywood Burbank Airport.

In 2022, the airport used the California Environmental Quality Act to file a lawsuit to block approval for California high-speed rail construction. The high-speed rail project plans to have their Palmdale-Burbank and Burbank-Los Angeles segments running through and beneath the airport's property, with an underground station to be built adjacent to the proposed replacement passenger terminal.

Facilities 

Hollywood Burbank Airport covers 555 acres (224 ha) at an elevation of 778 feet (237 m) above sea level. It has two asphalt runways: 15/33 is 6,886 by 150 feet (2,099 x 46 m) and 8/26 is 5,802 by 150 feet (1,768 x 46 m). Airliners generally take off on Runway 15 due to wind from the south, and land crosswind on Runway 8 since that is the only runway with ILS and clear terrain for the approach. Flights from the northeast sometimes land visually on Runway 15 to save the extra distance circling to Runway 8. When the wind is from the north airliners often make a visual left-base approach to Runway 33, with a left turn close to the airport.

In the year ending September 30, 2018, the airport had 133,669 operations, average 366 per day: 43% general aviation, 40% scheduled commercial, 17% air taxi, and <1% military. In October 2018, 91 aircraft were then based at this airport: 38 jet, 28 single-engine, 16 multi-engine, and 9 helicopter.

Hollywood Burbank Airport also has its own Aircraft Rescue and Firefighting (ARFF) station, which is housed in a hangar in the northwest quadrant of the airport. In addition to providing emergency services to support airport operations, the department supports the airport AED program, fire extinguisher inspections and training, in addition to inspections and emergency support for all airport structures. Beginning in 2012, the Burbank–Glendale–Pasadena Airport Authority equipped its ARFF with Rosenbauer Panther 1500 vehicles. Burbank was the first airport in the US to operate state-of-the-art Class 4 ARFF vehicles employing compressed air foam (CAF) technologies, which provide enhanced firefighting capabilities when paired with other tools like forward looking infrared (FLIR) and thermal imaging cameras (TICs). The airport operates with five firefighters and one captain, while FAA standards require Index C airports like Hollywood Burbank to have a minimum of two firefighters and one captain.

Terminals
Hollywood Burbank Airport has two terminals, "A" and "B", joined as part of the same building. Terminal A has nine gates numbered A1 to A9, Terminal B has five gates numbered B1 to B5.

Ground transportation

Hollywood Burbank Airport can be reached using the Hollywood Way exit off Interstate 5, the Hollywood Way (westbound) or Pass Avenue (eastbound) exit off State Route 134, the Victory Boulevard exit off State Route 170, or the Barham Blvd (northbound) exit off U.S. Route 101. Car and pedestrian access to the terminal is provided at either Hollywood Way and Thornton Avenue or on Empire Avenue one block west of Hollywood Way. On-site parking consists of valet parking, short-term parking, and Parking Lots E and G. Remote Parking Lot A is located at Hollywood Way and Winona Avenue. Remote Parking Lot C is located on Thornton Avenue west of Ontario Street. Shuttle buses are provided from Parking Lots A and C to the terminal buildings. A shuttle stop is also located at the corner of Hollywood Way and Thornton Avenue.

Lyft, Uber, and Wingz all use the passenger drop-off location in front of the main terminal for departing travelers—and arrivals use the adjacent Short Term Parking structure directly opposite the terminal.

There are two bus stop areas: Hollywood Way–Thornton Avenue (a short walk east of Terminal A) and Empire Avenue/Intermodal, a short walk south of Terminal B next to the train station. All Burbank-bound lines serve the Downtown Burbank Metrolink station.

Amtrak's Coast Starlight and Pacific Surfliner and Metrolink's Ventura County Line serve the Burbank Airport–South station located south of the airport. The train station is a short quarter mile walk from the terminal area. From this station, the Ventura County Line provides access to downtown Los Angeles and Ventura County; Amtrak's Pacific Surfliner provides access to San Luis Obispo, Santa Barbara, downtown Los Angeles, Anaheim, and San Diego.

Metrolink's Antelope Valley Line stops at the Burbank Airport–North station located about 1 mile north of the terminal near the intersection of San Fernando Boulevard and Hollywood Way, and a free on-demand shuttle takes passengers to the terminal, or passengers can also board a Metro bus free with Metrolink ticket. From this station, the Antelope Valley Line provides access to downtown Los Angeles and the Antelope Valley.

Airlines and destinations

Passenger

Destinations map

Cargo

Statistics

Top destinations

Airline market share

Annual traffic

Freight/Mail (lb.) (Scheduled and Non-Scheduled) 
(January 2022-September 2022)

Accidents and incidents
 On September 21, 1938, USAAC Chief Maj. Gen. Oscar Westover was killed in the crash of Northrop A-17AS, 36-349, c/n 289, '1', out of Bolling Field, Washington, D.C., in a crosswind short of the runway. The single-engined attack design, used as a high-speed staff transport, crashed into a house at 1007 Scott Road in Burbank. Also killed was Westover's mechanic, S/Sgt Samuel Hymes. (Another source identifies him as Sgt. Samuel Hyne.) Northeast Air Base, Massachusetts, was renamed Westover Field on December 1, 1939, later Westover AFB on January 13, 1948. The location of the crash may indicate that Gen. Westover's intended landing field was not Hollywood Burbank Airport (then Union Air Terminal), but a nearby landing field, Lockheed Aircraft Company Plant B-1 Airfield (34.189°N, 118.331°W), 1 mile southeast of Hollywood Burbank Airport, which existed from ca. 1928 until World War II. The site is now (2022) the Empire Center Shopping Center, with a Staples, Lowe's, and Target where the runway had been.
 On August 6, 1945, leading U.S. fighter ace Richard Bong was killed when his plane's primary fuel pump malfunctioned during takeoff on the acceptance flight of P-80A 44–85048. Bong either forgot to switch to the auxiliary fuel pump, or for some reason was unable to do so. Bong bailed out of the aircraft but was too low for his parachute to deploy. The plane crashed into a narrow field at Oxnard St & Satsuma Ave, North Hollywood.
 On October 31, 1951, a Pacific Southwest DC-3 crashed shortly after take-off into Valhalla Memorial Park Cemetery, immediately south of the airport. Though damaged, the fuselage remained intact and there were only very minor injuries.
 On September 8, 1955, Currey Air Transport Flight 24, a Douglas DC-3 bound for Oakland, crashed on the airport property while returning to the airfield after experiencing an engine failure shortly after takeoff.  The plane, N74663, struck a power line on the southern boundary of the airport, causing it to crash into two parked Air Force C-54 aircraft and a Lockheed Aircraft service hangar. The pilot, co-pilot and an airport employee on the ground were killed; the plane's stewardess and one passenger were seriously injured.  The remaining 29 passengers on board received minor injuries.
 On December 14, 1962, a Flying Tiger Line Lockheed L-1049H Super Constellation freighter (N6913C) crashed in dense fog  miles west of the airport during an instrument landing system (ILS) approach to Runway 07.  The Constellation clipped a telephone pole and billboard and crashed in an industrial and residential neighborhood near the intersection of Lankershim Boulevard and Vose Street in North Hollywood after the aircraft's 38-year-old pilot suffered a heart attack at a critical point in the landing approach.  All five occupants of the Constellation—the pilot, co-pilot, flight engineer and two non-revenue passengers—died in the crash.  Also killed were two persons in a commercial building and a teen-age girl in a house that were among the structures struck by the plane.
 On December 5, 1982, Douglas C-53 N163E operated by P. Crossman was damaged beyond repair in a taxiing accident.
 On March 5, 2000, Southwest Airlines Flight 1455, upon landing on Runway 8 at Burbank following a flight from Las Vegas, overran the runway, injuring 44.  The Boeing 737 crashed through a metal blast barrier at the end of the runway, then an airport perimeter fence, and came to rest in the traffic lanes of Hollywood Way, a main north–south thoroughfare.  The plane stopped near a Chevron gasoline station located across the street from the runway.  The incident resulted in the dismissal of the pilots.  The Chevron gasoline station was subsequently closed and removed due to safety concerns.
On September 21, 2005, JetBlue Flight 292 took off from Burbank, and the nose gear failed to retract and instead jammed sideways. The aircraft spent several hours in the air before safely making an emergency landing at LAX, with 140 passengers and 6 crew members aboard. The Airbus A320 was originally bound for JFK International Airport, in New York City. After the aircraft took off, the incident was quickly captured by news helicopters which ran feed that was shown live nationally on cable news. Many passengers on the flight said they watched images of their own aircraft's flight on JetBlue's LiveTV system.
 On October 13, 2006, a Gulfstream Aerospace jet overran the runway upon landing. There were no reported injuries amongst the five passengers and two crew members. New York Yankees third baseman Alex Rodriguez was on board, en route to attend the funeral of teammate Cory Lidle. Rodriguez was uninjured, but the accident happened two days after the fatal plane crash of his teammate.
 On December 6, 2018, Southwest Airlines Flight 278 from Oakland overran the runway in heavy rain. The flight was stopped by the EMAS installed following the similar Southwest Airlines Flight 1455 incident in 2000.
 On February 27, 2022 a near mid-air collision was reported at the Bob Hope Burbank Airport (BUR) when a SkyWest Embraer 175 was cleared to takeoff on runway 08 and a Mesa Airlines CRJ-900 was cleared to land immediately after on the same runway. The accident was averted by initiating a go around and neither plane suffered any damages and there were no injuries for any passenger on board.

See also
 California World War II Army Airfields
 List of airports in California

References

External links

 Hollywood Burbank Airport, official site
 Elevate BUR, official replacement terminal site
 Burbank Airport at Burbank.com
 Aerial image as of March 2004 from USGS The National Map
 
 

Airports in Los Angeles County, California
Buildings and structures in Burbank, California
Public transportation in Los Angeles County, California
Public transportation in the San Fernando Valley
Transportation in the San Fernando Valley
Airports established in 1930
1930 establishments in California
Airfields of the United States Army Air Forces Technical Service Command
Airfields of the United States Army Air Forces in California